Rotondella is a town and comune in the province of Matera, in the Southern Italian region of Basilicata.

Language
People of Rotondella speak R'tunnar (Rontondellese), a dialect of Basilicata.

Cuisine
U' pastizz 'rtunnar: Prodotto agroalimentare tradizionale (protected traditional food), half moon shaped baked good filled with minced meat.
 Fruzz'ul c'a muddica: Frizzuli pasta with fried bread crumbs
 Sospiri di Rotondella: Italian pastry made with Italian sponge cake, pastry cream, and glaze

Twin towns
 Casalfiumanese, Italy

References

Cities and towns in Basilicata